Erinna is a genus of air-breathing, freshwater snails, aquatic pulmonate gastropod mollusks in the family Lymnaeidae, the pond snails. This genus is endemic to the Hawaiian Islands, United States.

Species 
Species within the genus Erinna include:
 Erinna aulacospira (Ancey, 1889) – this species is considered as possibly extinct.
 Erinna newcombi H. Adams & A. Adams, 1855 – Newcomb's snail, type species

References 

Lymnaeidae